Panorama Software is a Canadian software and consulting company specializing in business intelligence. The company was founded by Rony Ross in Israel in 1993; it relocated its headquarters to Toronto, Canada in 2003.
Panorama sold its online analytical processing (OLAP) technology to Microsoft in 1996, which was built into Microsoft OLAP Services and later SQL Server Analysis Services, an integrated component of Microsoft SQL Server.

Products 

The company’s main product is a business intelligence (BI) suite named Necto.
Before 2011 it had a product called NovaView.
Necto offers data mining and report generation, allowing custom views of the data without having to wait to run a report. It lets users create collaborative "workboards" and visual presentations.  The users are able discover those who are attempting to analyze similar data sets. The company contends this focus on social analysis leads, starting with business data and connecting it with the people who are involved in this data.

Necto is a BI application based upon understanding of user behavior, one-click reporting, and collaborative decision making. It supports social sharing of data, similar to sharing found on consumer oriented social networking sites. Data analysis is treated as "conversations" which can themselves be followed and analyzed. Panorama encourages Necto enterprise users to form cross-departmental teams based on data research behaviors. It allows tracking of user behavior and making corresponding adjustments.

Necto includes analytics, custom reporting, intuitive dashboards, and integration with Microsofttechnology. It can use data sources including spreadsheets, in-memory, OLAP, or relational databases. Integration on Microsoft Azure and optimization with Microsoft SQL Server 2012 platform is also available. Necto integrates with SharePoint. It can be scaled up to manage thousands of users and several terabytes of data.

Panorama and Microsoft 
Panorama Software is the original developer of the online analytical processing technology that Microsoft acquired in 1996 and rebranded as SQL Server Analysis Services, a component of Microsoft SQL Server.
Since this acquisition, Panorama sells support as a Microsoft Gold ISV Competency partner.

References

External links 
 Panorama Software web site

Software companies of Canada
Online analytical processing
Companies based in Toronto
Software companies established in 1993
Privately held companies of Canada
Software companies of Israel
1993 establishments in Ontario
Canadian companies established in 1993